The Church of Our Lady of Pompei is a Roman Catholic, Dominican church in Victoria, Gozo, Malta.

History
The church was built to serve the Dominican sisters whose monastery they have adjacent to the church. The monastery was built in 1889. The church was opened to the public on 25 July 1900 and consecrated on July 1, 1923 by Bishop Angelo Portelli, the Auxiliary Bishop of Malta. The titular painting depicting Our Lady of Pompei is the work of Lazzaro Pisani. Bishop Giuseppe Pace crowned the Virgin of Pompei on October 16, 1966.  
Prior to 2009 a statue of Our lady of Pompei stood on top of the dome of the church. In 2009 it was destroyed by strong winds that lashed through the island. Nowadays a cross has been installed instead.

The church building is listed on the National Inventory of the Cultural Property of the Maltese Islands.

See also

Culture of Malta
History of Malta
List of Churches in Malta
Religion in Malta

References

Dominican churches in Malta
20th-century Roman Catholic church buildings in Malta
Victoria, Gozo
Church buildings with domes
National Inventory of the Cultural Property of the Maltese Islands
Roman Catholic churches completed in 1900